Huang Shuailu is a Chinese kickboxer.

As of April 2022 he was the #8 ranked Bantamweight kickboxer in the world by Combat Press.

Kickboxing career
On July 27, 2018 Huang faced Cao Zuoyan at a Faith Fight Championship event. He lost the fight by decision.

On May 19, 2019 Huang faced Zhang Yu at a Kunlun Combat Professional League	event. He won the fight by knockout in the third round with a low kick.

On June 21, 2019 Huang faced Xie Wenjie in the Kunlun Combat Professional League. He won the fight by knockout in the second round.

On December 16, 2019 Huang faced Zhao Boshi at ONE Hero Series December in a bout contested with MMA gloves. He lost the fight by unanimous decision.

On September 8, 2020 Huang faced Kaijie at Kunlun Combat Professional League. He won the fight by unanimous decision.

Huang was scheduled to face Cao Zhiyang on December 27, 2020 in a bare knuckle kickboxing fight at the Huya Kung Fu Carnival 3 event. He won the fight by second round technical knockout.

On November 27, 2021 Huang faced Lerdsila Chumpairtour at Wu Lin Feng 2021: World Contender League 7th Stage. The fight went to a draw, an extra round was contested which he won by decision. Lerdsila's team appealed the result considering that their fighter should have won after the initial 3 rounds.

On January 1, 2022 Huang was scheduled for a rematch with Yang Ming at Wu Lin Feng 527 in a fight serving as the world contender league final to earn a title shot at the Wu Lin Feng World 60 kg title. He lost the fight by unanimous decision.

Huang entered a 4-man tournament on March 26, 2022 at Wu Lin Feng 528. In semi final he defeated Zhao Chongyang by split decision. In the final he faced Yang Ming for the third time in a year and defeated him by split decision.

Fight record

|-  style="background:#cfc;"
| 2023-02-04 || Win|| align=left| Tsotne Sultanishvili || Wu Lin Feng 2023: Chinese New Year || Tangshan, China || Decision (Unanimous) || 3 ||3:00 
|-  style="background:#cfc;"
| 2022-12-09 || Win || align=left| Jin Hu || Wu Lin Feng 532, Final  || Zhengzhou, China || Decision (Unanimous)||3  ||3:00

|-  style="background:#cfc;"
| 2022-12-09 || Win || align=left| Yang Ming  || Wu Lin Feng 532, Semi Final  || Zhengzhou, China || Decision || 3 ||3:00

|-  style="background:#cfc;"
| 2022-09-24 || Win || align=left| Li Xancheng ||  Wu Lin Feng 531|| Zhengzhou, China || Decision (Unanimous)  || 3 ||3:00

|-  style="background:#cfc;"
| 2022-07-30 || Win || align=left| Zheng Guanglei ||  Battle Time Championship || Linyi, China || KO (Left hook to the body)  || 1 ||2:20

|-  style="background:#cfc;"
| 2022-03-26 || Win|| align=left| Yang Ming || Wu Lin Feng 528, Final || Zhengzhou, China || Decision (Split) || 3||3:00

|-  style="background:#cfc;"
| 2022-03-26 || Win|| align=left| Zhao Chongyang|| Wu Lin Feng 528, Semi Final || Zhengzhou, China || Decision (Split) || 3||3:00

|-  style="text-align:center; background:#fbb;"
| 2022-01-01 || Loss|| align=left| Yang Ming  || Wu Lin Feng 527, WLF World Contender League Final || Tangshan, China || Decision (Unanimous)|| 3 || 3:00

|-  style="background:#cfc;"
| 2021-12-16 || Win || align=left| Yang Hua ||Wu Lin Feng 526, WLF World Contender League Semi Final || Zhengzhou, China || Decision (Unanimous) || 3 || 3:00

|-  style="background:#cfc;"
| 2021-11-27 || Win|| align=left| Lerdsila Chumpairtour || Wu Lin Feng 2021: World Contender League 7th Stage || Zhengzhou, China ||Ext.R Decision || 4 ||3:00

|-  style="text-align:center; background:#cfc;"
| 2021-09-25 || Win || align=left| Li Yuankun|| Wu Lin Feng 2021: WLF in Tangshan WLF World Contender League  || Tangshan, China ||  Decision (Unanimous)|| 3 ||3:00

|-  style="text-align:center; background:#cfc;"
| 2021-05-29 || Win || align=left| Yang Ming || Wu Lin Feng 2021: World Contender League 4th Stage || Zhengzhou, China || Decision (Unanimous) || 3 || 3:00

|-  style="background:#fbb;"
| 2021-03-27 || Loss || align=left| Zhao Jiangfeng || Wu Lin Feng 2021: World Contender League 1st Stage || Zhengzhou, China || Decision (Split)|| 3 || 3:00

|-  style="text-align:center; background:#cfc;"
| 2020-12-27 || Win || align=left| Cao Zhiyang || Huya Kung Fu Carnival 3|| Beijing, China || TKO (3 Knockdown) || 2 || 1:23

|-  style="text-align:center; background:#cfc;"
| 2020-12-19 || Win || align=left| Zhang Jinhu || Kunlun Combat Professional League|| China || TKO (3 Knockdown) || 2 || 1:30

|-  style="text-align:center; background:#cfc;"
| 2020-09-29 || Win || align=left| Liu Wenjie || Kunlun Combat Professional League|| China || KO (Head kick) || 3 || 2:52

|-  style="text-align:center; background:#cfc;"
| 2020-09-08 || Win || align=left| Kaijie || Kunlun Combat Professional League|| Tongling, China || Decision (Unanimous)|| 3 || 3:00

|-  style="text-align:center; background:#fbb"
| 2019-12-16 || Loss ||align=left| Zhao Boshi || ONE Hero Series December || Beijing, China || Decision (Unanimous) || 3 || 3:00

|-  style="text-align:center; background:#cfc"
| 2019-09-23 || Win||align=left| Dongdong Song || ONE Hero Series September || Beijing, China || Decision (Unanimous) || 3 || 3:00

|-  style="text-align:center; background:#cfc;"
| 2019-06-21 || Win || align=left| Xie Wenjie || Kunlun Combat Professional League|| China || TKO (Knee to the head) || 2 ||  1:58

|-  style="text-align:center; background:#cfc;"
| 2019-06-06 || Win || align=left| Fang Kejin || Kunlun Combat Professional League|| China || TKO (Low kick) || 2 ||

|-  style="text-align:center; background:#cfc;"
| 2019-05-19 || Win || align=left| Zhang Yu || Kunlun Combat Professional League|| Tongling, China || KO (Low kick) ||3 ||

|-  style="text-align:center; background:#cfc;"
| 2019-04-20 || Win || align=left| Chen Ming || Kunlun Combat Professional League|| China || KO  ||  ||

|-  style="text-align:center; background:#fbb;"
| 2018-11- || Loss || align=left| Chen Yahong || Faith Fight Championship|| China || Decision || 3 ||3:00

|-  style="text-align:center; background:#fbb;"
| 2018-07-28 || Loss || align=left| Cao Zuoyan || Faith Fight Championship|| Shenzhen, China || Decision || 3 ||3:00

|-  style="text-align:center; background:#fbb;"
| 2017-10- || Loss || align=left| Jiang Feng || Dunhuang Legendary Fighting Championship|| China || Decision || 3 ||3:00  
|-
| colspan=9 | Legend:

References 

Chinese male kickboxers
1999 births
Living people